Roccavignale is a comune (municipality) in the Province of Savona in the Italian region Liguria, located about  west of Genoa and about  northwest of Savona.

Roccavignale borders the following municipalities: Castelnuovo di Ceva, Cengio, Millesimo, Montezemolo, and Murialdo.

References

Cities and towns in Liguria